Interlake-Eastern Regional Health Authority (IERHA)  is the governing body responsible for healthcare delivery and regulation for the Interlake and eastern regions of Manitoba.

Interlake-Eastern Regional Health Authority is one of 5 regional health authorities (RHAs) in Manitoba and is designated as an official French-language RHA. It was formed in 2012 by the merger of the former Interlake and North Eastman Regional Health Authorities.

Moreover, a significant portion of the region is considered to be part of northern Manitoba—such as Berens River—some with a remote area that is only accessible via air, water, or a winter road system.

, the IERHA includes 10 hospitals, 16 personal care homes, 17 community health offices, and 19 EMS stations; as well as 1 "Quick Care" clinic (Selkirk) and 6 dialysis sites (with 40 stations in total). The Interlake-Eastern Health Foundation provides financial support to all of the region’s facilities and programs to further improve "dedicated patient care."

Communities 
, the Interlake-Eastern region has a population of 132,000 residents, 27% of which is represented by the IER's 17 First Nation communities.

Designated as an official French-language regional health authority, the Interlake-Eastern Regional Health Authority has 2 French-language service areas: one surrounding St. Laurent on the west, the other surrounding St. Georges and Powerview-Pine Falls on the east.

The region includes the communities of:

 Arborg
 Ashern
 Beausejour
 Fisher Branch
 Pinawa
 Gimli
 Lac du Bonnet
 Lundar
 Oakbank
 Pine Falls
 Riverton
 Selkirk
 Stonewall 
 Whitemouth

Facilities

Selkirk Regional Health Centre 

In 2017, the IERHA completed the Selkirk Regional Health Centre (SRHC) to better accommodate residents health-care needs in the Interlake-Eastern RHA.

The SRHC is the centre of specialty surgical services in the region, as well as the region’s family birthing unit.

The new SRHC, whose construction began in Spring 2014, is located between the former general hospital at 100 Easton Dr. and the Selkirk Recreation Complex at 180 Easton Dr. Among other things, the renovation increased Selkirk's bed count from 53 to 65, expanded the outpatient area, tripled the size of the former emergency department, and provided a new interventional fluoroscopy room; as well as introducing the region’s only CT-scan equipment and the region’s first MRI—the 12th MRI unit in the province and one of only three outside of Winnipeg.

Notes

References

External links
 Interlake Regional Health Authority
 North Eastman Health Authority website
 Government of Manitoba - Regional Health Authorities

Health regions of Manitoba